McClelland-Davis House is a historic home located near Statesville, Iredell County, North Carolina.  The house was built about 1830, and is a two-story, five bay by two bay, transitional Federal / Greek Revival style frame dwelling.  It has a gable roof, one-story rear wing, and two single shoulder brick end chimneys. Also on the property are the contributing smokehouse and well house.

It was added to the National Register of Historic Places in 1980.

References

Houses on the National Register of Historic Places in North Carolina
Greek Revival houses in North Carolina
Federal architecture in North Carolina
Houses completed in 1835
Houses in Iredell County, North Carolina
National Register of Historic Places in Iredell County, North Carolina